Peter Charles Francis Popely (born 7 April 1943) is an English former professional footballer who played as a defender in the Football League for York City and in non-League football for Cliftonville.

References

1943 births
Living people
Footballers from York
English footballers
Association football defenders
York City F.C. players
English Football League players